Build Hearts From Stars is the debut full-length, but second release, from Syracuse, NY pop-punkers, Honor Bright.  It was released on June 3, 2007, but was re-released on Aux Records on December 1 of the following year, due to the initial pressing selling out.

A music video was made for the song "Take My Hand."

Track listing
"Bull in a China Shop"
"Tapdancer"
"Side Effects May Include Heartbreak and Self Loathing
"Kid Tested, Mother Approved"
"Take My Hand"
"Stage Dives and High Fives"
"I Gotta See a Thing About a Girl"
"This Situation"
"You Sure Can't Keep a Secret"
"Normal"
"I Gave You My Heart, You Gave Me A Pacemaker (acoustic)" (deluxe edition bonus track)
"If Only They Knew (acoustic)" (deluxe edition bonus track)

References

Honor Bright albums
2007 debut albums